1093 Freda, provisional designation , is a carbonaceous asteroid from the outer regions of the asteroid belt's background population, approximately 110 kilometers in diameter. It was discovered on 15 June 1925, by astronomer Benjamin Jekhowsky at the Algiers Observatory in Algeria, North Africa. The asteroid was named after French engineer Fred Prévost.

Orbit and classification 

Freda is a non-family asteroid of the main belt's background population. It orbits the Sun in the outer main-belt at a distance of 2.3–4.0 AU once every 5 years and 6 months (2,022 days). Its orbit has an eccentricity of 0.27 and an inclination of 25° with respect to the ecliptic.

The body's observation arc begins at Yerkes Observatory in February 1929, almost four years after its official discovery observation at Algiers.

Physical characteristics 

In the Tholen classification, Freda is a common carbonaceous C-type asteroid.

Rotation period 

Several rotational lightcurves of Freda were obtained from photometric observations by Brian Warner, Federico Manzini, and at the Palomar Transient Factory since 2007. Best-rated lightcurve analysis gave a rotation period of 19.67 hours with a brightness amplitude of 0.21 magnitude.

Diameter and albedo 

According to the surveys carried out by the Infrared Astronomical Satellite IRAS, the Japanese Akari satellite and the NEOWISE mission of NASA's Wide-field Infrared Survey Explorer, Freda measures between 88.01 and 126.04 kilometers in diameter and its surface has an albedo between 0.03 and 0.06.

The Collaborative Asteroid Lightcurve Link adopts the results obtained by IRAS, that is, an albedo of 0.0381 and a diameter of 116.73 kilometers based on an absolute magnitude of 8.83.

Naming 

This minor planet was named after Fred Prévost, a French civil engineer of mines and benefactor of the Faculty of sciences of Bordeaux. The official naming citation was mentioned in The Names of the Minor Planets by Paul Herget in 1955.

Notes

References

External links 
 Asteroid Lightcurve Database (LCDB), query form (info )
 Dictionary of Minor Planet Names, Google books
 Asteroids and comets rotation curves, CdR – Observatoire de Genève, Raoul Behrend
 Discovery Circumstances: Numbered Minor Planets (1)-(5000) – Minor Planet Center
 
 

001093
Discoveries by Benjamin Jekhowsky
Named minor planets
001093
19250615